Transaction Banking (TB) can be defined as the set of instruments and services that a bank offers to trading partners to financially support their reciprocal exchanges of goods (e.g.trade), monetary flows (e.g., cash), or commercial papers (e.g., exchanges). TB allows banks to maintain close relationship with their corporate clients so banks don’t want to be dis-intermediated by other players.

Transaction Banking division of a bank typically provides commercial banking products and services for both corporates and financial institutions, including domestic and cross-border payments, risk mitigation, international trade finance as well as trust, agency, depositary, custody and related services. It comprises the Cash Management, Trade Finance and Trust & Securities Services businesses. Although instant some business banking depending on 3rd party 3-5 working days others over 10 working days.

A number of global trends are leading to a renewed focus on the transaction banking sector. These trends include the globalization of
trade, the increasing importance of liquidity management and a heightened emphasis on securing relationships in a world where both competition
and clients are becoming more global and sophisticated. Transaction banking is also particularly attractive in the current economic
context because it often has relatively low regulatory capital requirements.

References

Banking